Beyatt Lekweiry (born 11 April 2005) is a Mauritanian footballer who plays as a midfielder for AS Douanes on loan from FC Nouadhibou, and the Mauritania national team.

Club career
As a youth, Lekweiry played for hometown club FC Nouadhibou of the Mauritian Premier League. In 2021 he joined AS Douanes on loan for the season. At the time he was considered by Mauritanian media outlets to be one of the greatest footballing prospects in the country.

International career
Lekweiry was a standout player for Mauritania at the 2020 U-20 Arab Cup at age 15. The following year he was selected to represent Mauritania in the 2021 Africa U-20 Cup of Nations but missed the tournament because of injury.

In January 2022, Lekweiry was named to his nation's senior squad for the 2021 Africa Cup of Nations for his first senior call-up. At 16 years old, he was the youngest player at the tournament. He went on to make his senior debut in the team's final match of the Group Stage, coming on as a substitute against Mali on 20 January 2022.

International career statistics

References

External links
National Football Teams profile
Soccerway profile

2005 births
Living people
Mauritanian footballers
Mauritania international footballers
Association football midfielders
2021 Africa Cup of Nations players